The Voluntary System of Accountability (VSA) and its College Portraits website is a college search tool for prospective students and an accountability tool for public institutions. 

Students and their families can use the College Portraits to find a presentation of comparable information that comes directly from public universities.  

Participating institutions use the College Portraits to highlight common information prospective students and families seek.  College Portraits data elements include: admissions requirements, retention and graduation rates, campus community highlights, academic programs, safety, and cost of attendance, to name a few.   In 2010, a College Affordability Estimator net price calculator was added to help prospective students estimate their individual net cost to attend a specific university.  The Estimator meets the requirements of the Higher Education Opportunity Act.

Institutions and systems can use the College Portraits to meet accountability requirements from governing boards, state legislatures, state coordinating offices, and other outside groups, often reducing their burden and duplication of effort.  The College Portraits can also be used during the accreditation process as evidence of student learning outcomes, institutional improvement, transparency, and commitment to the public good. 

The VSA is a joint project of the Association of Public and Land-grant Universities (APLU) and the American Association of State Colleges and Universities (AASCU) in collaboration with the higher education community.   VSA institutions represent more than half of all public four-year institutions, 66 percent of all APLU members, and 60 percent of APLU and AASCU's joint membership.  VSA participating institutions enroll 63 percent of undergraduate students attending public universities.

See also
Association of Public and Land-grant Universities
American Association of State Colleges and Universities
College Portrait of Undergraduate Education
Collegiate Learning Assessment
ACT
Educational Testing Service

References

External links
 http://www.vsaanalytics.org/index.cfm
 http://www.collegeportraits.org

University and college rankings in the United States
American Association of State Colleges and Universities